The Ministry of Infrastructure of Ukraine functions as the main executive body that controls Ukraine's transportation infrastructure including roads, trains, and communications. The department is based on the former Transport and Communications Ministry and also oversees the implementation of government tourism policies.

History
In December 2010, Ukrainian President Viktor Yanukovych announced that the former Transport and Communications Ministry would be reorganized into the Ministry of Infrastructure. The head office was located in Kyiv. On 12 May 2011, the Ministry of Infrastructure was approved as the successor of the Transport and Communications Ministry.

On 2 December 2022 the Shmyhal Government merged the Ministry of Infrastructure with the Ministry of Communities and Territories Development creating the Ministry of Development of Communities, Territories and Infrastructure.

Structure
The Ministry comprises a central body, led by the minister, his/her first deputy, and other deputies who assist the minister. The Ministry also consists of several state administrations that specialize in certain fields and coordinate operations of government companies.

The ministry supervises implementation of government policy in transport and communication sectors as well as security related to transport. Transport of fuel fossils (i.e. oil and gas) is related to the government ministry on energy and fuel, while most of security responsibility matters are supervised by Ministry of Interior or other state agencies.

Subordinated agencies

 State Aviation Service of Ukraine
 State Agency of Automobile Roads of Ukraine Ukravtodor (see Roads in Ukraine)
 State Service of Ukraine in Security on Transport 
 State Transport Special Service (specialized agency)

Reorganized, liquidated, and not listed agencies
 State Agency of Ukraine in Tourism and Resorts, a government agency in tourism (liquidated, successor is unknown)
 State Administration of Rail Transport, in 2015 it was incorporated as a public stock company Ukrzaliznytsia
 State Auto transportation Service became State Service of Ukraine in Security on Transport 
 State Service of Maritime and River Transport of Ukraine 
 Service of Maritime and River Transport of Ukraine
 State Special Communications Service of Ukraine
 National Agency of Ukraine in preparation and conducting of Euro-2012
 State Service of Communication, On June30, 2011 the State Service of Communication, State Administration of Communication (less the state owned company Ukrposhta), and the Telecommunication Systems and Information Security branch of the Security Service of Ukraine were consolidated to become the administration of State Special Communications Service of Ukraine.

Companies (former state agencies)
 Ukrposhta
 Ukrzaliznytsia
 Presa - State enterprise in distribution of periodic publications
 Ukrainian Sea Ports Authority
 Maritime Search and Rescue Service

List of Ministers of Transportation

Ministry of [Rail]ways (1917–1920)
In the Imperial Russia and after its dissolution its successor states, a term "ways of communication" encompassed administration of any means of transportation but were focused primarily on railways. In Ukraine, named as the ministry of ways was headed by railway specialists.

State Secretariat of Communications (Ways)

Ministry of Transport (Soviet Ukraine)

Post Soviet Ministry

List of Ministers of Communications

See also

 Transport in Ukraine
 List of airports in Ukraine
 Telecommunications in Ukraine
 Internet in Ukraine
 Tourism in Ukraine

References

External links 
 Official Website of the Ukrainian Ministry of Infrastructure 
 Ministry of Transportation and Communication (Archive) 

Infrastructure
Infrastructure
Ukraine
Ukraine, Infrastructure
Ukraine
Transport organizations based in Ukraine
Ukraine